Knattspyrnufélagið Valur is an Icelandic athletic club based in Reykjavík, Iceland. In 2017, they competed in the following competitions: League Cup, Cup, Úrvalsdeild, UEFA Europa League, Super Cup.

Competitions

League Cup

Group 3

Matches

Super Cup

Úrvalsdeild

Results summary

Results by matchday

Matches

References

External links
Official website

Valur (men's football) seasons